Baheratoil Unionis a union of Sakhipur Upazila, Tangail District, Bangladesh. It is situated 52 km east of Tangail, the administrative headquarters of the district.

Demographics

According to Population Census 2011 performed by Bangladesh Bureau of Statistics, The total population of Baheratoil union is 24413.There are 6207 households in total.

Education

The literacy rate of Baheratoil Union is 36.1% (Male-38.4%, Female-34.2%).

See also
 Union Councils of Tangail District

References

Populated places in Dhaka Division
Populated places in Tangail District
Unions of Sakhipur Upazila